Ezharappallikal, meaning seven and a royal church, are the seven major churches or Christian communities of Saint Thomas Christians across Malabar Coast of India that are believed to have been founded by Thomas the Apostle in the first century. According to Indian Christian traditions, the Apostle Thomas arrived in Muziris (Kodungallur) in AD 52, established the Ezharappallikal (Seven royal churches or Seven and a half Churches) and evangelised  in present-day Kerala and Tamil Nadu. Many of these churches built near Jewish  and Brahmin settlements. These were at Maliankara (Kodungallur), Kollam, Palayoor, Kottakkayal (North Paravur or Kottakkavu), Kokkamangalam, Niranam and Nilackal (Chayal). Thiruvithamcode church in Kanyakumari was built on the land given by arachan (king) and hence it is often referred in the name Arappally (half church). Similarly, the Churches at Malayattoor and Aruvithura are also referred to as Arappallikal.

Ezharappallikal
The seven churches are located at Kodungallur, Kollam, Palayoor, Kottakkavu (Paravoor), Kokkamangalam (South Pallippuram), Niranam and Nilackal (Chayal).

Kodungallur

The Kodungallur church is considered to be the oldest church built by St. Thomas on the Malabar Coast. Kodungallur is known in various names such as Muziris, Muchiri, Muyirikkode, Shengala, Shinjli, Makottai, Mahadevarpattanam and Cranganore. The Church at Kodungallur rose to prominence after the fall of the Christian community in the Coromandel Coast, especially Mylapore. Francisco Roz, the first latin Archbishop of Saint Thomas Christians, describes Cranganore as the most ancient episcopal see in India. Cranganore had three churches, namely, the Church of Saint Mary, the Church of Saint Thomas and the Church of Saint Quriakose. The Church of Saint Thomas was constructed by Thomas of Cana, a Christian merchant who arrived in Cranganore. The Church of Saint Quriakose was the Cathedral Church of the Metropolitan of Saint Thomas Christians. The Church of Saint Mary is believed to be the one originally founded by Saint Thomas. 

1604, Francisco Roz wrote a report on the Saint Thomas Christians in which he quotes an account of the three churches in Cranganore.

The current Marthoma Pontifical shrine (Kodungaloor Mar Thoma Church) church is situated on the banks of the River Periyar about 6 km from Kodungallur, in the village of Azhikode in Kerala.

Palayur

St. Thomas Church, Palayoor is located at Palayur (also spelled Palayoor), in Thrissur district in Kerala on the west coast of India. According to tradition, it was established in 52 AD by St Thomas. It is the first church in India, and is called an Apostolic Church credited to the Apostolate of St. Thomas who preached and also started the conversion of people to Christianity here.

Pierre du Jarric gives part of a letter by James Fenicio, a Jesuit missionary in the Zamorin's territory.

Kottakkavu

Kottakkavu Church was established by St. Thomas in North Paravur in the Ernakulam district. It is considered to be one of the oldest Church in Kerala. The church of Kottakkavu was rebuilt in the 9th century. It was renovated for the third time in 1308.  Pope Gregory XIII raised the altar of this church to the status of privileged altar in 1575. The church was originally dedicated to Saints Sabor and Aproth. The Synod of Diamper removed the their names and dedicated the church to Gervasius and Protasis. 

MS Vatican Syriac N. iv., dated A.D. 1556, has the following colophon in folio 278:

Kokkamangalam

 Kokkamangalam church (or Gokkamangalam church) is situated at Gokkamangalam near Cherthala in the Alappuzha district. St. Thomas sailed to Gokkamangalam where he preached the gospel for about a year. 1600 people converted to Christianity through him according to the narration in "Rampan Pattu", an ancient form of Christian folksong prevalent in Kerala. He formed a Christian community at Kokkamangalam and enshrined a cross for the faithful.

Nilakkal

This church area was discovered during the time of Malankara Metropolitan Pulikottil Thirumeni (then head of the Orthodox Church). For the harmony of ecumenism among St Thomas Christians, then leadership of the Orthodox church paved the way to dedicate the church for all denominations. It was a mountain route of trade between Kerala and Tamil Nadu. Saint Thomas accompanied by Habban came over here and baptised 1100 people.

Niranam

Niranam Pally is one of the oldest churches in Kerala. It is believed that the church was founded by St. Thomas, in AD 54 at Niranam near Thiruvalla in Pathanamthitta district. The church was reconstructed several times since then. The stones in the church show the reconstruction in 1259. On his way from Kollam,  he arrived at Niranam (Thrikpapaleswaram) by sea. He converted two Hindu Brahmin families named Pattamukkil and Thayyil and two Nair families named Manki and Madathilan to Christianity. He also gave priestly powers to the members of Pattamukkil family.

It is believed to be one of the oldest churches in Kerala and thus in India as well as among the oldest ones in the world. The architecture shows striking similarities to ancient temple architecture.

Our Lady of Purification Church also known as the Port Kollam Church is a historic Roman Catholic church near Kollam Port in Kollam district of Kerala. According to ecclesiastical tradition the church was established by Thomas the Apostle in 52 CE along with six other churches in Kerala and these churches together are called Ēḻarappaḷḷikaḷ.[1][2][3][4] The church follows Latin Rite and is in the Roman Catholic Diocese of Quilon.[

Tradition holds that in AD 52, Thomas the Apostle travelled to Kerala's coast.[5][6] For people who were baptized by Saint Thomas to worship, a church was built in Kollam between CE 52 and 78. However, Violent sea erosion destroyed this church. The believers built a second church for worship with the King of Kollam's approval, but it was also destroyed by sea erosion. The ruins of the second church are still visible in the sea during low tides. The name "Pallikallu" given to it by the local fishermen literally translates as "the stone of the great church". A group of local divers retrieved a rock from the submerged church ruins in February 2021, and it was then installed in the church as a symbol of the community's unwavering faith.

Arappallikal
The churches at Thiruvithamkode, Malayattoor, and Aruvithura are referred to as Arappallikal, which may be translated either as Half churches or Royal churches.

Thiruvithamkode

Thiruvithamcode St Marys Orthodox Church (Arapalli) or Thomayar Kovil, is located in Thiruvithamcode, Tamil Nadu, India, 30 km to the south of the Kerala state border. It is believed by the Christian communities in Kerala that the historic Thiruvithamcode Arappally, also called Amalagiri church as named by the Chera King Uthiyan Cheralathan, was built by St. Thomas, known as the Apostle of India, in AD 52.AD

Malayattoor

St. Thomas is believed to have returned to Malankara coast via Malayatur where he establishes ‘the half church’ (a small Christian community dependent on the Church of Maliamkara). Oral tradition says that while travelling through Malayattor, faced with hostile natives, he fled to the hilltop where he said to   have remained in prayer and that he left his footprint on one of the rocks. According to beliefs, during prayer, he touched a rock, upon which blood poured from it.

Aruvithura

It is believed that St. Thomas visited Irapeli and converted a prominent families into Christianity and laid a cross on the banks of the Meenachil River. Local traditions also support this belief. This is the first church in the Palai diocese and was built in the 1st century. St. Thomas founded seven and a half churches there. The 'half' church refers to a cross laid at Irapoli by St. Thomas, making the church of Irapeli the half church. It is reported that the church was rebuilt once or twice before the 16th century. The ancient churches were constructed and maintained by the prominent families in the area until the 16th century. In the beginning of the 16th century a new church was built under the leadership of Kallarackal Kathanar by the prominent families. The church was first dedicated to the Assumption of Saint Mary. In the 14th century when either the Nilackal Church or the Chayal Church founded by St. Thomas was destroyed, several families migrated to Irapeli bringing with them a statue of St. George. Gradually the church itself was re-dedicated to Saint George.

References

Further reading
 A.C. Perumalil, The Apostles in India, Patna (India), XTTI, 1971.
 George Menachery, Ed.,"The St.Thomas Christian Encyclopaedia of India", esp. Vol.2, 1973.
 George Menachery, Ed.,"The Nazranies", Indian Church History Classics, Vol. 1, 1998, esp. books fully reproduced in it by Mackenzie, Medlycott, Farquar, and many others.

Saint Thomas Christians
Ethnic groups in India
Kerala society
Churches in India
Social groups of Kerala
Christian communities of India
Ethnoreligious groups in India